Joseph Caryl (November 1602 – 25 February 1673) was an English ejected minister.

Life

He was born in London, educated at Merchant Taylors' School, and graduated at Exeter College, Oxford, and became preacher at Lincoln's Inn. He frequently preached before the Long Parliament, and was a member of the Westminster Assembly in 1643. By order of the parliament he attended Charles I in Holmby House, and in 1650 he was sent with John Owen to accompany Cromwell to Scotland. In 1662, following the Restoration, he was ejected from his church of St Magnus-the-Martyr near London Bridge.  He continued, however, to minister to an Independent congregation in London till his death in March 1673, when John Owen succeeded him.

Works
His piety and learning are displayed in his commentary on Job (12 vols., 1651–1666; 2nd ed., 2 vols., fol. 1676–1677).

Family
Joseph Caryl married, and his daughter Elizabeth married the merchant Benjamin Shute; their child John Shute, the lawyer and theologian, was born at Theobalds, Essex. He changed his name, and became John Barrington, 1st Viscount Barrington.

References

External links

Attribution

1602 births
1673 deaths
Westminster Divines
People educated at Merchant Taylors' School, Northwood
Alumni of Exeter College, Oxford
Ejected English ministers of 1662
English Calvinist and Reformed theologians
17th-century Calvinist and Reformed theologians
English male non-fiction writers